Dario Šarić (born 30 May 1997) is a Bosnian professional footballer who plays as a midfielder for Serie B club Palermo and the Bosnia and Herzegovina national team.

Šarić started his professional career at Carpi, who loaned him to Virtus Castelfranco in 2015 and to Siena in 2016. In 2020, he joined Ascoli. Two years later, he switched to Palermo.

A former youth international for Bosnia and Herzegovina, Šarić made his senior international debut in 2022.

Club career

Early career
Šarić started playing football at Cesena's youth academy, before joining Carpi's youth setup in 2014. In February 2015, he was loaned to Virtus Castelfranco until the end of season. In July 2016, he was sent on a season-long loan to Siena.

In September 2020, he moved to Ascoli.

Palermo
In August 2022, Šarić signed a four-year deal with Palermo. He made his official debut for the team on 3 September against Reggina.

International career
Šarić represented Bosnia and Herzegovina at various youth levels.

In May 2021, he received his first senior call-up, for friendly games against Montenegro and Denmark, but had to wait until 26 September 2022 to make his debut in a 2022–23 UEFA Nations League game against Romania.

Career statistics

Club

International

References

External links

1997 births
Living people
People from Cento
Sportspeople from the Province of Ferrara
Footballers from Emilia-Romagna
Italian people of Bosnia and Herzegovina descent
Citizens of Bosnia and Herzegovina through descent
Bosnia and Herzegovina footballers
Bosnia and Herzegovina youth international footballers
Bosnia and Herzegovina international footballers
Bosnia and Herzegovina expatriate footballers
Association football midfielders
A.C. Carpi players
A.C.N. Siena 1904 players
Ascoli Calcio 1898 F.C. players
Palermo F.C. players
Serie D players
Serie C players
Serie B players
Bosnia and Herzegovina expatriate sportspeople in Italy